was a professional Go player.

Biography 
Sakai was promoted to 6 dan in 1970. He had 3 brothers, Sakai Michiharu, Sakai Yasuo and Sakai Yoshimitsu. He also had many students including Baba Shigeru, Ito Yoji, Hikosaka Naoto, Hiroe Katsuhiko, Okumura Hideo, Hamanaka Takamitsu, Akedo Kazumi, Ikezaki Tokinori, and Hotta Seiji.

Titles & runners-up 

Was never a runner-up to any tournament

1920 births
1983 deaths
Japanese Go players